Guillermo Mercado Romero (born 1 March 1938) is a Mexican politician who served as the Governor of Baja California Sur from 1993 to 1999. He is a member of the Institutional Revolutionary Party (PRI). He also served in the Senate and the Chamber of Deputies.

Corruption charges
Mercado left office in 1999. In early 2001, Mercado and eighteen other former Mexican government officials were charged with diverting approximately $55 million in public funding. Mercado was indicted for two charges: Mercado's gubernatorial administration was accused of purchasing airline tickets for official government travel through a travel agency owned by his wife and daughter. Second, Mercado was also charged with improperly transferring ownership of public land to a private research institute during his tenure as governor.

Mercado's wife, Maria Concepcion Casas de Mercado, owned a condo in San Diego, California, which she sold in January 2001 for $330,000. She then purchased a new home in El Cajon, California, in February 2001, just one month later, for $188,000. In June 2001, U.S. immigration agents questioned Mercado at his home in El Cajon to determine his legal status. Mercado showed the investigators a valid pilot's license and Social Security card as proof that he was in the United States legally. Mercado also had a visa, which allows Mexicans living near the U.S. border to travel up to 25 miles inside the U.S. for up to three days.

References

Living people
1938 births
Governors of Baja California Sur
Institutional Revolutionary Party politicians
20th-century Mexican politicians
Politicians from Baja California Sur
People from La Paz, Baja California Sur
University of Guadalajara alumni
Members of the Senate of the Republic (Mexico)
Members of the Chamber of Deputies (Mexico)